The flag of Sabah, a state of Malaysia, was adopted on 16 September 1988. It is red, white and three different shades of blue. The mountain is in the canton as in the 1963 flag, but now in dark blue on a light blue background. The field is medium blue over white over red. The mountain shown on the flag (and the state's coat of arms) is Mount Kinabalu.

The five different colours represent the five divisions in Sabah.

 A silhouette of Mount Kinabalu represents the state of Sabah.
 Zircon blue represents peace and calmness.
 Icicle blue represents unity and prosperity.
 Royal blue represents strength and harmony.
 White represents purity and justice.
 Chilli red represents courage and determination.

Symbolism

First Sabah state flag (1963–1982) 
On 31 August 1963, Sabah adopted a four-striped flag (red over white over yellow over blue) with a green canton and a brown mountain – symbol of Mount Kinabalu. The green canton represents the State’s young land and forests, while Mount Kinabalu brown in colour represents the people’s unity. The red stripe represents courage and the willingness to sacrifice for the country, white represents purity, yellow represents state’s riches and blue represents peace and happiness.

Second Sabah state flag (1982–1988) 
The second flag design was created in 1981 by the Sabah People's United Front Party (BERJAYA) state government. It was formally adopted on 1 January 1982. It had a completely different design from the previous one: blue over white with a red triangle on the hoist. It is similar to the Trisakti flag used by the neighbouring state of Sarawak until 31 August 1988, which was red over white with a blue triangle on the hoist.

This flag should not be confused with the Flag of the Czech Republic and the Flag of the Philippines.

Historical flags

City, district, and municipal flags 
Sabah does not assign flags for its cities, districts and municipal areas. However, some local government authorities in the state have adopted their own flags. Examples are, Beluran District and Kota Kinabalu, the state capital, of whose flags are displayed below.

See also 
 Coat of arms of Sabah

References

External links 
 Sabah State Government Official Website
 Flagspot.net: About Sabah

Sabah
Sabah
Sabah
1988 establishments in Malaysia